Rosie Clarke (born 17 November 1991) is an English former runner who competed primarily in the 3000 metres steeplechase. She represented Great Britain at the 2017 World Championships without reaching the final. Clarke retired from competitive running in 2021.

International competitions

Personal bests

Outdoor
800 metres – 2:08.92 (Oxford 2013)
1500 metres – 4:12.10 (Charlottesville 2015)
One mile – 4:54.38 (Oxford 2012)
3000 metres – 9:15.04 (Monaco 2016)
10 kilometres – 33:30 (Paris 2016)
2000 metres steeplechase – 6:29.53 (Parliament Hill 2016)
3000 metres steeplechase – 9:36.75 (Palo Alto 2017)

Indoor
800 metres – 2:08.31 (Birmingham 2013)
1500 metres – 4:16.49 (Prague 2015)
One mile – 4:31.75 (Fayetteville 2015)
3000 metres – 9:10.99 (Sheffield 2014)

References

1991 births
Living people
People from Pembury
Sportspeople from Kent
English female middle-distance runners
British female middle-distance runners
English female steeplechase runners
British female steeplechase runners
English female long-distance runners
British female long-distance runners
World Athletics Championships athletes for Great Britain
Commonwealth Games competitors for England
Athletes (track and field) at the 2018 Commonwealth Games
British Athletics Championships winners
Alumni of the University of Bath